Kim Mi-seop (born 24 December 1972) is a South Korean modern pentathlete. He competed in the men's individual event at the 1996 Summer Olympics.

References

1972 births
Living people
South Korean male modern pentathletes
Olympic modern pentathletes of South Korea
Modern pentathletes at the 1996 Summer Olympics
Place of birth missing (living people)
Asian Games medalists in modern pentathlon
Modern pentathletes at the 1994 Asian Games
Modern pentathletes at the 2002 Asian Games
Asian Games gold medalists for South Korea
Asian Games silver medalists for South Korea
Asian Games bronze medalists for South Korea
Medalists at the 1994 Asian Games
Medalists at the 2002 Asian Games